In 1909, a British writer wrote that the Kanakkan people wore a sacred thread, which is normally reserved for high caste Brahmins.

The Padannan is also called Kanakkan. They were brought to Kerala to maintain accounts of the temples and given the title Kanakkapillai (accountant). The title Kanakkapillai has become Kannakkan in the course of time. However, they are not using the title Kanakkapillai. 

Indian castes
Social groups of Kerala